Daphnella gracilis is a species of sea snail, a marine gastropod mollusk in the family Raphitomidae.

Description
The length of the shell attains 36.8 mm.

Distribution
This marine species occurs in the East China Sea.

References

gracilis
Gastropods described in 1952